The Fucine Lake ( or ) was a large endorheic lake in western Abruzzo, central Italy, stretching from Avezzano in the northwest to Ortucchio in the southeast, and touching Trasacco in the southwest. Once the third largest lake in Italy, it was drained in 1878.

Lore
Virgil mentioned the former lake in the Aeneid in book 7, in that it weeps for Umbro, the healer priest killed tragically in battle. (See line 7:882 in the Fagles translation).

Roman drainage

The Romans knew the lake as Fucinus Lacus and founded settlements on its banks, including Marruvium. It was the site of the Battle of Fucine Lake in 89 BC; however, while the lake provided fertile soil and a large quantity of fish, it was also believed to harbour malaria, and, having no natural outflow, repeatedly flooded the surrounding arable land. The Emperor Claudius attempted to control the lake's maximum level by digging a  drainage tunnel through Monte Salviano, requiring 30,000 workers and eleven years, but with uncertain success. Of the collapse of one of the tunnels Cassius Dio observed
"When the Fucine Lake caved in, the prominent freedman Tiberius Claudius Narcissus was severely blamed for it. For he had been in charge of the undertaking, and it was thought that after spending a good deal less than he had received he had then purposely contrived the collapse, in order that his wrong-doing might not be detected."
The larger 19th century tunnel, along the same route as the Roman tunnel, destroyed most of the archaeology of the Roman tunnel, which is why the success of the earlier Claudian scheme is so uncertain. The deeper Hadrianic canal destroyed the archaeology of the Claudian canal. It sloped to the tunnel at 0.05% (a gradient of one in two thousand).

Drain blockage
As the Empire fell, maintenance of the Roman drainage scheme stopped. Sediment and vegetation blocked the collecting canal. An earthquake on a fault crossing the collecting canal dropped the land on the lake side  relative to the tunnel entrance. Investigations where the fault crosses the canal reveal that large amounts of sediment had accumulated in the canal before the earthquake. On the assumption that this earthquake would damage Rome it seems very likely that the earthquake occurred shortly before 508 AD when the earthquake damage to the Colosseum was repaired. The lake appears to have returned to its uncontrolled pre-Claudian area by the end of the 5th century and certainly by the end of the 6th century.
 
Some suggestion, or attempt, to restore the Roman drainage scheme appears in both the 13th and 15th centuries but neither succeeded.

Modern drainage
In the 19th century, the Swiss engineer Jean François Mayor de Montricher was commissioned by the prince Alessandro Torlonia to drain the lake. A  and  canal was begun in 1862 and after more than 13 years, the lake was completely drained. The resulting plain is one of Italy's most fertile regions. Antiquities from the Roman occupation of the land, after the first drainage scheme, became part of the Torlonia collection.

See also
 Fucine Inlet
 Fucino Space Centre
 List of drying lakes

References

Further reading
 A. Campanelli (ed) 2001 Il Tesoro del lago, L'archeologia del Fucino e la collezione Torlonia
 Sandro D'Amati 1960 Il prosciugamento del Fucino, Avezzano
 October 1996 Paleoseismology related to deformed archaeological remains in the Fucino plain Implications for subrecent seismicity in Central Italy Annali di Geofisica
 Cesare Letta 1972 I Marsi e il Fucino nell’antichità, Milan.
 Brisse & Rotrou 1876 Desséchement du Lac Fucino éxécuté par le Prince Alexandre Torlonia (en Juin 1861). (The draining of Lake Fucino accomplished by Prince Alexander Torlonia, English translation by V. de Tivoli Junr), Rome
 Leveau, P. (1993), "Mentalité économique et grands travaux: le drainage du Lac Fucin," Annales: Économies Sociérés Civilizations, Vol. 48, No. 1, Jan.-Feb., pp. 3-16.

External links

 Google Earth view

Mountain lakes
Former lakes of Italy
Lakes of Abruzzo
Avezzano
Marsica
Endorheic lakes of Europe